Michael Molata (born 10 February 1973) is a German former professional footballer who played as a defender. He played in the Bundesliga with Arminia Bielefeld and Hamburger SV and in the UEFA Intertoto Cup with Hamburger SV.

Career
Born in Bad Langensalza, Molata played youth football for Carl Zeiss Jena before starting his career there, making his debut in the 1991–92 season whilst Carl Zeiss Jena were in the 2. Bundesliga. With Carl Zeiss Jena now in the Regionalliga, Molata joined 2. Bundesliga side Arminia Bielefeld in 1995 before getting promoted to the Bundesliga in the 1995–96 season. Having made 11 appearances in the Bundesliga with Arminia Bielefeld across the 1996–97 season, scoring twice, he joined Hamburger SV in the summer of 1997 and made 13 appearances for Hamburg in the Bundesliga during the 1997–98 season and one in the UEFA Intertoto Cup, though he did not score. Having left Hamburg in the summer of 1998, he went on to play for Karlsruher SC, Hannover 96, Babelsberg 03 and Union Berlin in the 2. Bundesliga and Holstein Kiel in the Regionalliga.

References

External links
 
 
 

1973 births
Living people
German footballers
Association football defenders
People from Bad Langensalza
FC Carl Zeiss Jena players
Arminia Bielefeld players
Hamburger SV players
Karlsruher SC players
Hannover 96 players
SV Babelsberg 03 players
1. FC Union Berlin players
Holstein Kiel players
Bundesliga players
2. Bundesliga players
Regionalliga players
Footballers from Thuringia